Cheiridium is a genus of pseudoscorpions belonging to the family Cheiridiidae.

The genus was first described by Menge in 1855.

The species of this genus are found in Europe and Northern America.

Species:
 Cheiridium museorum (Leach, 1817)

References

Cheiridiidae
Pseudoscorpion genera